Guido Frisoni (born 11 October 1970) is a Sammarinese former cyclist. He competed in the individual road race at the 1992 Summer Olympics.

References

External links
 

1970 births
Living people
Sammarinese male cyclists
Olympic cyclists of San Marino
Cyclists at the 1992 Summer Olympics